Kapetan Louka or Kapitan Louka is a dance from the region of Macedonia in Greece. It is a dance specifically from the area of Kozani. The dance is named after a freedom fighter in Macedonia, Loukas Kokkinos born in Grevena.

See also
Greek dances
Greek music

Sources

Greek dances